Torgrim Sommerfeldt (born 26 June 1989) is a Norwegian professional basketball player for the Kongsberg Miners of the Basketligaen Norge. He played collegiately for the Manhattan Jaspers.

External links
Profile at scorersfirst.com
Profile at realgm.com

1989 births
Living people
Aris Leeuwarden players
Dutch Basketball League players
Manhattan Jaspers basketball players
Norwegian men's basketball players
Norwegian expatriate sportspeople in the United States
Sportspeople from Drammen
Small forwards
Centrum Tigers players
Bærum Basket players
Asker Aliens players